Cellophane is a thin, transparent sheet made of regenerated cellulose. Its low permeability to air, oils, greases, bacteria, and liquid water makes it useful for food packaging. Cellophane is highly permeable to water vapour, but may be coated with nitrocellulose lacquer to prevent this.

Cellophane is also used in transparent pressure-sensitive tape, tubing and many other similar applications.

Cellophane is compostable and biodegradable, and can be obtained from biomaterials. Production, however, uses carbon disulfide (CS2), which has been found to be highly toxic to workers. The lyocell process, however, can be used to produce cellulose film without involving carbon disulfide.

"Cellophane" is a generic term in some countries, while in other countries it is a registered trademark.

Production
Cellulose from wood, cotton, hemp, or other sources is dissolved in alkali and carbon disulfide to make a solution called viscose, which is then extruded through a slit into a bath of dilute sulfuric acid and sodium sulfate to reconvert the viscose into cellulose. The film is then passed through several more baths, one to remove sulfur, one to bleach the film, and one to add softening materials such as glycerin to prevent the film from becoming brittle.

A similar process, using a hole (a spinneret) instead of a slit, is used to make a fibre called rayon. Chemically, cellophane, rayon and cellulose are polymers of glucose; they differ structurally rather than chemically.

History

Cellophane was invented by Swiss chemist Jacques E. Brandenberger while employed by Blanchisserie et Teinturerie de Thaon. In 1900, inspired by seeing wine spill on a restaurant's tablecloth, he decided to create a cloth that could repel liquids rather than absorb them. His first step was to spray a waterproof coating onto fabric, and he opted to try viscose. The resultant coated fabric was far too stiff, but the diaphanous film coating could be separated from the backing cloth easily and in one undamaged piece.  Seeing the possibilities of this new material on its own, Brandenberger soon abandoned his original idea.

It took ten years for Brandenberger to perfect his film. His chief improvement over earlier work with such films was adding glycerin to soften the material. By 1912 he had constructed a machine to manufacture the film, which he had named Cellophane, from the words cellulose and diaphane ("transparent"). Cellophane was patented that year. The following year, the company Comptoir des Textiles Artificiels (CTA) bought the Thaon firm's interest in Cellophane and established Brandenberger in a new company, La Cellophane SA.

Whitman's candy company initiated use of cellophane for candy wrapping in the United States in 1912 for their Whitman's Sampler. They remained the largest user of imported cellophane from France until nearly 1924, when DuPont built the first cellophane manufacturing plant in the US. Cellophane saw limited sales in the US at first since while it was waterproof, it was not moisture proof—it held or repelled water but was permeable to water vapor. This meant that it was unsuited to packaging products that required moisture proofing. DuPont hired chemist William Hale Charch (1898–1958), who spent three years developing a nitrocellulose lacquer that, when applied to Cellophane, made it moisture proof. Following the introduction of moisture-proof Cellophane in 1927, the material's sales tripled between 1928 and 1930, and in 1938, Cellophane accounted for 10% of DuPont's sales and 25% of its profits.

Cellophane played a crucial role in developing the self-service retailing of fresh meat. Cellophane visibility helped customers know quality of meat before buying. Cellophane also worked to consumers’ disadvantage when manufacturers learned to manipulate the appearance of a product by controlling oxygen and moisture levels to prevent discoloration of food. It was considered such a useful invention that cellophane was listed alongside other modern marvels in the 1934 song "You're the Top" (from Anything Goes).

The British textile company Courtaulds' viscose technology had allowed it to diversify in 1930 into viscose film, which it named "Viscacelle". However, competition with Cellophane was an obstacle to its sales, and in 1935 it founded British Cellophane Limited (BCL) in conjunction with the Cellophane Company and its French parent company CTA. A major production facility was constructed at Bridgwater, Somerset, England, from 1935 to 1937, employing 3,000 workers. BCL subsequently constructed plants in Cornwall, Ontario (BCL Canada), as an adjunct to the existing Courtaulds viscose rayon plant there (from which it bought the viscose solution), and in 1957 at Barrow-in-Furness, Cumbria. The latter two plants were closed in the 1990s.

Today
Cellulose film has been manufactured continuously since the mid-1930s and is still used today. As well as packaging a variety of food items, there are also industrial applications, such as a base for such self-adhesive tapes as Sellotape and Scotch Tape, a semi-permeable membrane in a certain type of battery, as dialysis tubing (Visking tubing), and as a release agent in the manufacture of fibreglass and rubber products. Cellophane is the most popular material for manufacturing cigar packaging; its permeability to moisture makes cellophane a good product for this application as cigars must be allowed to "breathe" while wrapped and in storage.

Cellophane sales have dwindled since the 1960s, due to alternative packaging options. The polluting effects of carbon disulfide and other by-products of the process used to make viscose may have also contributed to its falling behind lower cost petrochemical-based films such as biaxially-oriented polyethylene terephthalate (BoPET) and biaxially oriented polypropylene (BOPP) in the 1980s and 1990s. However, as of 2017, it has made something of a resurgence in recent times due to its being biosourced, compostable, and biodegradable. Its sustainability record is clouded by its energy-intensive manufacturing process and the potential negative impact of some of the chemicals used, but significant progress in recent years has been made by leading manufacturers in reducing their environmental footprint.

Material properties
When placed between two plane polarizing filters, cellophane produces prismatic colours due to its birefringent nature. Artists have used this effect to create stained glass-like creations that are kinetic and interactive.

Cellophane is biodegradable, but highly toxic carbon disulfide is used in most cellophane production. Viscose factories vary widely in the amount of  CS2 they expose their workers to, and most give no information about their quantitative safety limits or how well they keep to them.

Branding
In the UK and in many other countries, "Cellophane" is a registered trademark and the property of Futamura Chemical UK Ltd, based in Wigton, Cumbria, United Kingdom. Transparent sticky tape was marketed by Texcel Cellophane Tape, a New Jersey industrial tape corporation from
early 1940s. In the US and some other countries "cellophane" has become genericized, and is often used informally to refer to a wide variety of plastic film products, even those not made of cellulose, such as PVC-based plastic wrap.

See also
 Bioplastics
 British Cellophane
 Genericized trademark

References

External links

Cellophane Invention

Biodegradable plastics
Bioplastics
Brands that became generic
Cellulose
Packaging materials
Transparent materials
Swiss inventions
Products introduced in 1912